is a passenger railway station located in the city of Sagamihara, Kanagawa Prefecture, Japan, operated by the East Japan Railway Company (JR East).

Lines

Station layout
Kamimizo has a single side platform facing one track. The track is elevated above ground level, and the station building lies below the track. Directly operated by the railway company, the station features a staffed ticket-service window. It also has machines for selling and collecting tickets, and for fare adjustment. Additional facilities include an elevator, an escalator, a multipurpose toilet, beverage vending machines, and public telephones.
Kamimizo also has a bus center. Kanagawa Chuo Kotsu operates buses that stop at the station's six bus platforms.

History
Kamimizo Station was scheduled to be opened as a station on the Sagami Railway in June 1927, but work was suspended due to lack of funds. On June 1, 1944, the Sagami Railway was nationalized and merged with the Japan National Railways, at which time the station received its current name. Scheduled freight services were discontinued from 1962. On April 1, 1987, with the dissolution and privatization of the Japan National Railways, the station came under the operation of JR East. The station building was complexly rebuilt in 1991. Automated turnstiles using the Suica IC card system came into operation from November 2001.

Passenger statistics
In fiscal 2019, the station was used by an average of 6,341 passengers daily (boarding passengers only).

The passenger figures (boarding passengers only) for previous years are as shown below.

Surrounding area
The station serves traffic to four schools. They are Kamimizo Middle School (operated by the city) and three prefectural high schools: Kamimizo, Sagamitana and Sagamihara. Also nearby are a Daiei supermarket and a swimming pool, which the U.S. team used to practice for the 2006 FINA Synchronised Swimming World Cup (hosted in Yokohama).

See also
List of railway stations in Japan

References

External links

Station information page 
神奈川中央交通 Kanagawa Chūō Kōtsū (bus operator)

Railway stations in Kanagawa Prefecture
Railway stations in Japan opened in 1931
Railway stations in Sagamihara
Sagami Line